Expedition was launched in 1763, almost certainly under another name. She entered the registers as Expedition in 1795. Between 1799 and 1807 she made seven voyages as a Liverpool-based slave ship. She was condemned as unseaworthy at Antigua in early 1808 after disembarking at Jamaica the slaves from her seventh voyage.

Career
Expedition first appeared in Lloyd's Register (LR) in 1795. A later listing in the Register of Shipping included the note that the repairs in 1793 had included lengthening.

Lloyd's List reported in November 1795 that Expedition, Smith, master, had put into Ramsgate due to leaks. She was coming from Oporto.

Slave voyages

1st slave voyage (1799): Captain John Murdock acquired a letter of marque on 12 December 1798; he sailed from Liverpool on 12 January 1799. Epxedition acquired slaves at Calabar. She stopped at São Tomé and then St Vincents. Expediton, late Murdock, was at St Vincents and then sailed for Jamaica. Captain Robert McAdam replaced Murdock and Expedition arrived at Kingston, Jamaica on 3 August with 347 slaves. She sailed from Kingston on 4 September and arrived back at Liverpool on 4 November. She had left Liverpool with 43 crew members and she had suffered 19 crew deaths on her voyage.

2nd slave voyage (1800–1801): Captain George Cormack acquired a letter of marque on 27 February 1800. He sailed from Liverpool on 13 March. Expedition acquired her slaves at Malembo and arrived at Kingston, Jamaica on 7 October with 232 slaves. She had left Liverpool with 34 crew members and she arrived at Jamaica with 30. She sailed from Kingston on 27 November and arrived back at Liverpool on 18 January 1801. She had suffered nine crew deaths on her voyage.

3rd slave voyage (1801–1802): Captain John Ward acquired a letter of marque on 10 March 1801. He sailed from Liverpool on 14 April. Expedition acquired her slaves at Calabar. She arrived with them at Demerara 3 December 1801. She sailed for Liverpool on 9 February 1802 and arrived there on 8 April. She had left Liverpool with 34 crew members and had suffered nine crew deaths on her voyage.

4th slave voyage (1802–1803): Captain John D'Arcy sailed from Liverpool on 10 July 1802. Expedition acquired slaves at the Cameroons. She stopped at Barbados and then arrived at Dominica on 1 February 1803 with 256 slaves. She sailed for Liverpool on 10 March and arrived back there on 18 April. She had left Liverpool with 23 men and had suffered six crew deaths on her voyage.

In November Lloyd's List reported that Expedition, of Liverpool, had detained St Augustine, from Malaga to Vera Cruz. Also, Lady Francis, of Liverpool, had detained St Anna, Ligitadana, master, from Havana to Cadiz. Both St Augustine and St Anna were sent into Liverpool. 
 
5th slave voyage (1804–1805): Captain Robert Roberts acquired a letter of marque on 17 March 1804, on 25 April sailed for West Africa. Expedition acquired her slaves at Cape Grand Mount and arrived at Suriname on 17 October with 254 slaves. She sailed from Suriname on 17 October and arrived back at Liverpool on 25 January 1805. She had left Liverpool with 33 crew members and had suffered six crew deaths on her voyage. Expedition arrived at Liverpool with a cargo consisting of sugar, bales of cotton, coffee, 180 "elephant teeth", and barwood.

6th slave voyage (1805–1806): Captain Roberts sailed from Liverpool on 11 August 1805, bound for West Africa. On 27 November Roberts wrote a letter to Expeditions owners from Bassa Roads reporting that the factory at Crab Island had suffered an explosion that had injured two captains and a doctor. Expedition arrived at Suriname on 28 February 1806 with 235 slaves. She sailed from Suriname on 30 April and arrived back at Liverpool on 9 June. She had left Liverpool with 37 crew members and had suffered 13 crew deaths on her voyage. Expedition arrived at Liverpool with a cargo consisting of the same commodities as on his prior voyage, but with 274 elephant teeth.

7th slave voyage (1806–1807): Captain Roberts sailed from Liverpool on 8 September 1806, 
bound for the Windward Coast. Expedition acquired slaves between Rio Nuñez and the Assini River. She arrived at Kingston, Jamaica on 23 June 1807 with 215 slaves. She sailed from Kingston on 28 November, bound for Liverpool.

Fate
In March 1808 Lloyd's List reported that Expedition, Roberts, master, had been sailing from Jamaica to Liverpool when she had to put into Antigua in distress. Expedition was condemned there. Her cargo was transshipped in Fairfield and King George.

Citations

1763 ships
Ships built on the River Thames
Age of Sail merchant ships of England
Liverpool slave ships
Maritime incidents in 1808